
This is a list of properties and districts in Mississippi that are listed on the National Register of Historic Places. There are more than 1,400 sites distributed among all of Mississippi's 82 counties.

The locations of National Register properties and districts (at least for all showing latitude and longitude coordinates below), may be seen in an online map by clicking on "Map of all coordinates".

Current listings by county
The following are approximate tallies of current listings by county. These counts are based on entries in the National Register Information Database as of March 13, 2009 and new weekly listings posted since then on the National Register of Historic Places web site. There are frequent additions to the listings and occasional delistings and the counts here are approximate and not official. New entries are added to the official Register on a weekly basis.  Also, the counts in this table exclude boundary increase and decrease listings which modify the area covered by an existing property or district and which carry a separate National Register reference number.

See also

List of National Historic Landmarks in Mississippi
List of Mississippi Landmarks

References

 
Mississippi